Pandit Deendayal Upadhyaya (25 September 1916 – 11 February 1968) was an Indian politician, proponent of integral humanism ideology  and leader of the political party Bharatiya Jana Sangh (BJS), the forerunner of Bharatiya Janata Party (BJP). Upadhyaya started the monthly publication Rashtra Dharma, broadly meaning 'National Duty', in the 1940s to spread the ideals of Hindutva revival. Upadhyaya is known for drafting Jan Sangh's official political doctrine, Integral humanism, by including some cultural-nationalism values and his agreement with several Gandhian socialist principles such as sarvodaya (progress of all) and swadeshi (self-sufficiency).

Early life 
He was brought up in a Brahmin family by his maternal uncle. His education, under the guardianship of his maternal uncle and aunt, saw him attend high school in Sikar. The Maharaja of Sikar gave him a gold medal, Rs 250 to buy books and a monthly scholarship of Rs 10. and did his Intermediate in Pilani, Rajasthan. He took a BA degree at the Sanatan Dharma College, Kanpur. In 1939 he moved over to Agra and joined St. John's College, Agra to pursue a master's degree in English literature but could not continue his studies. He did not take up his MA exams due to some family and financial issues.  He was came to be known as Panditji for appearing in the civil services examination, wearing the traditional Indian dhoti-kurta and cap.

Career 
Upadhyaya had come into contact with the RSS through a classmate, Baluji Mahashabde, while studying at Sanatan Dharma College in 1937. He met the founder of the RSS, K. B. Hedgewar, who engaged with him in an intellectual discussion at one of the shakhas. Sunder Singh Bhandari was also one of his classmates at Kanpur. He started full-time work in the RSS from 1942. He had attended the 40-day summer vacation RSS camp at Nagpur where he underwent training in Sangh Education.  After completing second-year training in the RSS Education Wing, Upadhyaya became a lifelong pracharak of the RSS. He worked as the pracharak for the Lakhimpur district and, from 1955, as the joint Prant Pracharak (regional organiser) for Uttar Pradesh. He was regarded as an ideal swayamsevak of the RSS essentially because ‘his discourse reflected the pure thought-current of the Sangh’.

Upadhyaya started the monthly Rashtra Dharma publication from Lucknow in the 1940s, using it to spread Hindutva ideology. Later he started the weekly Panchjanya and the daily Swadesh.

In 1951, when Syama Prasad Mookerjee founded the BJS, Deendayal was seconded to the party by the RSS, tasked with moulding it into a genuine member of the Sangh Parivar. He was appointed as General Secretary of its Uttar Pradesh branch, and later the all-India general secretary. For 15 years, he remained the outfit's general secretary. He also contested by-poll for the Lok Sabha seat of Jaunpur from Uttar Pradesh in 1963 bi election when Jansangh MP Bramh Jeet Singh died, but failed to attract significant political traction and did not get elected.

In the 1967 general elections, the Jana Sangh got 35 seats and became the 3rd largest party in the Lok Sabha. The Jan Sangh also went onto be a part of the Samyukta Vidhayak Dal, an experiment of having non-Congress opposition parties as a coalition to form governments in multiple states This brought the right and the left of the Indian political spectrum on one single platform. He became president of the Jana Sangh in December 1967 in the Calicut session of the party. His presidential speech in that session focused on multiple aspects right from the formation of coalition government to language. No major events happened in the party during his tenure as the president that ended in 2 months in February 1968 due to his untimely death.

Upadhyaya edited Panchjanya (weekly) and Swadesh (daily) from Lucknow. In Hindi, he wrote a drama on Chandragupta Maurya, and later wrote a biography of Shankaracharya. He translated a Marathi biography of Hedgewar.

In December 1967, Upadhyaya was elected president of the BJS.

Philosophy 
Integral humanism was a set of concepts drafted by Upadhyaya as political program and adopted in 1965 as the official doctrine of the Jan Sangh.

Death 
On February 10, 1968, Upadhyaya boarded a late-night train from Lucknow to Patna, which made several stops along the way. Upadhyaya was confirmed to have been seen alive at Jaunpur, shortly after midnight. The train briefly stopped at Varanasi around 01:40 am before proceeding on to Mughalsarai; on arrival at 2:10 am, Upadhyaya was not aboard. At approximately 2:20 am, his body was located outside the Mughalsarai train station, nearly 750 feet from the platform. A five-rupee note was in his hand.

The Central Bureau of Investigation (CBI) investigation team determined that Upadhyaya had been pushed out of the coach by robbers just before the train entered Mughalsarai station. A passenger travelling in the cabin adjoining Upadhyaya's reported seeing a man removing files and bedding from it. This man was later identified as Bharat Lal. The CBI arrested Lal and his associate Ram Awadh and charged the pair with murder and theft. According to the CBI, the men stated that Upadhyaya had caught them attempting to steal his bag and threatened to call the police, so they pushed him from the train. The men were acquitted of the murder charges. Lal was convicted of the theft, but appealed to the Allahabad High Court.

The murder remains officially unresolved. Many people believed the murder to be politically motivated, and felt that the CBI had not handled the case correctly. Following the acquittals, over 70 MPs demanded a commission of inquiry. The Government of India appointed Justice Y.V. Chandrachud of the Bombay High Court to lead a single-person inquiry into the facts of the case. His findings were published in 1970. According to Chandrachud, the CBI's investigation had produced an accurate picture of the death as a spontaneous incident resulting from an interrupted theft. He found no evidence of political motivation.

In 2017, Upadhyaya's niece and several politicians demanded a fresh probe in his murder.

Legacy 

According to his supporters, he worked to decolonise Indian political thought, and even a veteran Congressman of Uttar Pradesh, Sampoornanand, wrote in the preface of Upadhyaya's Political Dairy, describing him as "one of the most notable political leaders of our time”
. Another move considered important in the 1960s anti-Congress campaign, involved Deen dayal getting together with Ram Manohar Lohia to issue a Lohia-Deendayal joint statement in May 1964 envisioning a framework for common program.

Since 2016 the BJP government under Prime Minister Narendra Modi named several public institutions after him. In Delhi, a road/marg has been named after Upadhyaya. In August 2017, the BJP state government in UP proposed renaming of Mughalsarai station in honour of Upadhyaya as his dead body was found near it. Opposition parties protested this move in the Parliament of India. The Samajwadi Party protested with a statement that the station was being renamed after someone "who had made "no contribution to the freedom struggle". The Deen Dayal Research Institute deals with queries on Upadhyaya and his works.

In 2018 a newly constructed cable-stayed bridge in Surat was named Pandit Dindayal Upadhyay Bridge in honor of him.

On 16 February 2020 in Varanasi, Narendra Modi opened the Pandit Deendayal Upadhyaya Memorial Centre and unveiled a 63-foot statue of Upadhyaya, his tallest statue in the country.

See also 
 Deen Dayal Upadhyaya Grameen Kaushalya Yojana
 Deen Dayal Upadhyaya Gram Jyoti Yojana
 Deen Dayal Antyoday Upchar Yojna
 Pandit Deendayal Upadhyay Indoor Stadium
 Pandit Deendayal Petroleum University
 Deendayal Upadhyaya Hospital, Shimla
 Pandit Deendayal Upadhyaya Institute of Archaeology

References

External links
  A short glimpse at the life and times of Pt. Deendayal Upadhyaya  at Nehru Memorial

Upadhyaya, Pandit
Upadhyaya, Pandit
People from Mathura district
Bharatiya Jana Sangh politicians
Rashtriya Swayamsevak Sangh pracharaks
Dr. Bhimrao Ambedkar University alumni